Justin Hughes may refer to:

 Justin Hughes (law professor), professor of law specializing in intellectual property law
 Justin Hughes (soccer) (born 1985), American soccer player